Pedavadlapudi railway station (station code:PVD), is an Indian Railways station in Pedavadlapudi of Andhra Pradesh. It lies on the Vijayawada–Gudur section of Howrah–Chennai main line and is administered under Vijayawada railway division of South Coast Railway zone.

Classification 
In terms of earnings and outward passengers handled, Pedavadlapudi is categorized as a Non-Suburban Grade-6 (NSG-6) railway station. Based on the re–categorization of Indian Railway stations for the period of 2017–18 and 2022–23, an NSG–6 category station earns nearly  crore and handles close to  passengers.

Infrastructure 
The station building has 3 platforms. A new station building is proposed and sanctioned here and is under construction. The new building compromises of 3platforms and 5 tracks. The station will have triple electrified line passing through it which is the Howrah–Chennai and New Delhi–Chennai main lines

References

External links 

Railway stations in Guntur district
Railway stations in Vijayawada railway division